Am I Still Autistic?: How a Low-Functioning, Slightly Retarded Toddler Became the CEO of a Multi-Million Dollar Corporation is a 2011 auto-biographical, self-help book written by Dr. John R. Hall. It is an account of Hall's experiences with autism both as someone who was diagnosed with the condition and as the father of a special needs child.

Background 

The book recounts Hall's childhood and adult life after Hall was diagnosed as "severely autistic" with other developmental issues prior to the age of 2. The book chronicles Hall's journey which includes the founding of Greenwood & Hall, an educational technology company based in Santa Ana, California, the birth of Hall's son, and how Hall dealt with the autism diagnosis of his own son.

References

Sources 

Am I Still Autistic?: How a Low-Functioning, Slightly Retarded Toddler Became the CEO of a Multi-Million Dollar Corporation, Dr. John R. Hall. Opportunities In Education, LLC., Santa Monica. 2011 
TedX Manhattan Beach: Journey To Purpose, 13 October 2012
A father with autism deals with his son's diagnosis, 17 April 2012
Autism doesn't have to be the end of hope, 5 April 2012

2011 non-fiction books
Self-help books
Books about autism